Kapil Krishna Thakur (1940-2014) was an Indian politician. He hailed from Thakurnagar in West Bengal.

He was elected to the 16th Lok Sabha in the 2014 Indian general election from Bangaon (Lok Sabha constituency), West Bengal, as an All India Trinamool Congress candidate. But he died just a few months into his term.

He was a graduate of the University of Calcutta. He was the eldest son of Matua Boro Maa Binapani Devi and the sanghadhipati of Matua Mahasangha. Majulkrishna Thakur, who is also a politician, is his younger brother.

He died at Kolkata on 13 October 2014, after being ill for sometime.

References

India MPs 2014–2019
Lok Sabha members from West Bengal
People from North 24 Parganas district
1940 births
University of Calcutta alumni
2014 deaths
Trinamool Congress politicians from West Bengal
Matua people